was a Japanese daimyō of the mid-Edo period, who ruled the Mito Domain. He was the son of Matsudaira Yoritoyo, the lord of the Takamatsu Domain. His childhood name was Matsudaira Kemaro (松平軽麻呂) later changed to Tokugawa Tsuruchiyo (徳川鶴千代).

Family
 Father: Matsudaira Yoritoyo (1680-1735)
 Mother: Yuasa-dono
 Wife: Miyohime (1708-1746) daughter of Tokugawa Yoshizane
 Concubine: Okajima-dono
 Children:
 Matsudaira Yoriyuki (1727-1774) by Okajima
 Tokugawa Munemoto by Miyohime

Ancestry

References

1705 births
1730 deaths
Lords of Mito